The 1973–74 IHL season was the 29th season of the International Hockey League, a North American minor professional league. Nine teams participated in the regular season, and the Des Moines Capitols won the Turner Cup.

Regular season

Turner Cup Playoffs

Awards
 Gary F. Longman Memorial Trophy - IHL Rookie of the Year: Frank DeMarco (Des Moines Capitols)

External links
 Season 1973/74 on hockeydb.com

IHL
International Hockey League (1945–2001) seasons